The Growing Pains European Tour was the sixth concert tour in by American singer-songwriter Mary J. Blige, in support of her platinum eighth studio album, Growing Pains (2007). It began in May 2008 and continued through July 2008. In addition to visiting cities throughout Europe, Blige also performed four dates in Australia.

Opening Act
Bryn Christopher (Select dates)

Set list

 "MJB" 
 "Grown Woman"
 "Reminisce" / "Mary Jane (All Night Long)" / "I'm The Only Woman" / "Real Love"
 "You Bring Me Joy"
 "Be Happy"
 "Sweet Thing"
 "Love No Limit"
 "Everything"
 "Take Me as I Am"
 "Not Gon' Cry"
 "I'm Goin' Down"
 "Fade Away"
 "No More Drama"
 "One"
 "MJB Da MVP"
 "Work That"
 "Enough Cryin"
 "Be Without You"
Encore
"Just Fine"
"Family Affair"

Tour dates

References

Mary J. Blige concert tours
2008 concert tours